Follow the Stars Home is a 2001 American made-for-television romantic drama film directed by Dick Lowry. The film is based upon Luanne Rice's 2000 novel of the same name and was produced for the Hallmark Hall of Fame.

Six years later, Dianne is a single mom taking care of her handicapped child, a daughter whom she named Julia, with the help of her mother. One day, she meets young Amy Williams, who is growing up in a dysfunctional family. Her father died and her alcoholic mother Tess gets involved with an abusive man, Buddy. Amy, trying to escape from her home life during summer, starts helping Dianne care for Julia. Amy soon develops a friendship with Julia, which delights Dianne.

One day, Buddy, frustrated by the noise he is making, throws Amy's puppy from a bridge into the water. Amy, determined to save him, jumps after him and lands into the hospital. Child services are contacted and it is decided that Amy is not allowed to live with her mother anymore. Buddy is arrested and faced with the prospect of never seeing her daughter again, Tess, who still loves Amy very much, agrees to enter rehab. In the meantime, Amy is taken in by Dianne.

Tragedy strikes again when she and Amy are hit by a drunk driver. Amy suffers a broken arm, but Dianne is wounded more severely. She is visited in the hospital by Mark, who wants a second chance. After questioning his motives for a while, she decides to forgive him. David meets Mark in a diner and leads Mark to believe that Julia doesn't have long to live.  Mark then proposes to Dianne and she accepts.  But as they are talking about their future, Dianne realizes that Mark still doesn't care about Julia and is waiting for her to die.  Hurt and infuriated, she dumps Mark for good.  In the end, she accepts a proposal from David. Tess also completes rehab and reconciles with Amy

Cast
Kimberly Williams as Dianne Parker-McCune
Campbell Scott as David McCune
Eric Close as Mark McCune
Alexa Vega as Amy Williams
Blair Brown as Hannah Parker
Roxanne Hart as Tess
Tim Ransom as Buddy
Amanda and Caitlin Fein as Julia Parker-McCune
Octavia Spencer as Hildy 
Patricia Belcher as Counselor
Judith Drake as Admitting Nurse
Suzy Nakamura as Martha

References

External links

2001 television films
2001 films
2001 romantic drama films
American romantic drama films
Films based on American novels
Hallmark Hall of Fame episodes
CBS network films
Films directed by Dick Lowry
American drama television films
2000s American films